SU Ursae Majoris, or SU UMa, is a close binary star in the northern circumpolar constellation of Ursa Major. It is a periodic cataclysmic variable that varies in magnitude from a peak of 10.8 down to a base of 14.96. It is moving further from the Earth with a heliocentric radial velocity of +27 km/s.

The variable nature of this star was discovered at the Moscow Observatory by Lidiya Tseraskaya (L. Ceraski) in 1908. It was classified as a U Geminorum-type variable, or dwarf nova. Observation since 1926 showed that this variable undergoes two different types of eruptions: a short maxima lasting around two days that ranged in brightness between 11.6–12.9 magnitude, and a longer maxima extending for 13 days that ranged between 10.4–11.8 magnitude. The later event came to be referred to as 'supermaxima'. Similar dwarf novae of this class have since been discovered, and SU UMa is now the prototype for this sub-category of variable stars.

It consists of a white dwarf star that is acquiring matter from its close companion via an accretion disk. This disk is unstable and undergoes periodic outbursts which increase the luminosity of the system. X-ray emission has been detected in the vicinity of the white dwarf, which drops by a factor of four during outbursts. This emission is theorized to come from the boundary layer between the white dwarf and its accretion disk.

See also
 Superhump

References

Further reading

White dwarfs
Dwarf novae
Spectroscopic binaries
Ursa Major (constellation)
Ursae Majoris, SU
J08122826+6236224